The Sterling Street station is a station on the IRT Nostrand Avenue Line of the New York City Subway. Located in Prospect Lefferts Gardens, Brooklyn at the intersection of Sterling Street and Nostrand Avenue, the station is served by the 2 train at all times and the 5 train on weekdays.

History 
The Dual Contracts, which were signed on March 19, 1913, were contracts for the construction and/or rehabilitation and operation of rapid transit lines in the City of New York. The Dual Contracts promised the construction of several lines in Brooklyn. As part of Contract 4, the IRT agreed to build a subway line along Nostrand Avenue in Brooklyn. The construction of the subway along Nostrand Avenue spurred real estate development in the surrounding areas. The Nostrand Avenue Line opened on August 23, 1920, and the Sterling Street station opened along with it.

The platforms at Sterling Street were lengthened during the 1950s to  so that the platforms could accommodate 10-car trains.

Station layout 

The underground station has two tracks and two side platforms. The platforms have original 1920s Dual Contracts era tiling. The name tablets have "STERLING ST." in white letters on a brown background with a blue and brown border. The tile's trim line consists of light brown coloring with a border composed of a mix of dark blue and brown coloring. An intermediate line of green runs between these two borders.

The platforms are offset at the north end, where they were extended in the 1960s (completed in 1964) and tiling from that time period was installed. The name tablets here run at regular intervals and have "STERLING STREET" in white letters on a brown background. Both platforms and the mezzanine have light blue I-beam columns at regular intervals. The mezzanine walls have four different large frames of drawings and paintings. It is not known who the author or what the name of this artwork is.

This is the only other station with two side platforms on the IRT Nostrand Avenue Line that allows a free transfer between directions (besides Flatbush Avenue, which uses a U-shaped set of side platforms). All stations to the south, including Flatbush Avenue, have their fare control areas on platform level.

Exits
The station's only entrance/exit is a small mezzanine above the platforms towards the northern end. Inside fare control, it has two staircases going down to each platform, a newsstand, and a turnstile bank. Outside fare control, it has token booth and two street staircases leading up to both northern corners of Nostrand Avenue and Sterling Street.

References

External links 

 
 nycsubway.org — Unknown Artwork at Sterling Street (unknown date)

IRT Nostrand Avenue Line stations
New York City Subway stations in Brooklyn
Railway stations in the United States opened in 1920
1920 establishments in New York City
Flatbush, Brooklyn